Mineral Resources Limited (also shortened to MinRes) is a Western Australian mining services company.

History
Mineral Resources was established in July 2006 when pipeline manufacturing and contracting business PIHA, Crushing Services International and Process Minerals International merged and was listed on the Australian Securities Exchange.

Mineral Resources was added to the S&P/ASX 50 in June 2022 as one of the 50 largest companies by market capitalisation on the ASX.

Operations
Mineral Resources operates two iron ore hubs: Utah Point Hub in Port Hedland and Yilgarn Hub in Esperance. Mines are operated at Iron Valley, Koolyanobbing and Kumina.

Mineral Resources is involved in bulk ore transportation in the Pilbara. In 2014, Mineral Resources purchased six UGL Rail C44aci locomotives and 382 iron ore wagons taking over the operation of its services from Aurizon.

Minerals Resources operates two hard rock lithium mines in Western Australia; Mount Marion in the Goldfields, and Wodgina in the Pilbara.

References

Companies based in Perth, Western Australia
Companies listed on the Australian Securities Exchange
Mining services companies of Australia
Non-renewable resource companies established in 2006
2006 establishments in Australia